Leslie James Banks CBE (9 June 1890 – 21 April 1952) was an English stage and screen actor, director and producer, now best remembered for playing gruff, menacing characters in black-and-white films of the 1930s and 1940s, but also the Chorus in Laurence Olivier's wartime version of Henry V.

Early life and career
Leslie Banks was born in West Derby, Liverpool, Lancashire, to George and Emily (née Dalby) Banks. He attended school at Glenalmond College in Scotland, and later studied at Keble College, Oxford with the intention of becoming a parson, but decided against this.

He joined Frank Benson's company, and made his acting debut in October 1911 at the town hall in Brechin, playing Old Gobbo in The Merchant of Venice. He then toured the United States and Canada with Henry V. Esmond and Eva Moore in 1912 and 1913. Returning to London, he appeared for the first time on the West End stage at the Vaudeville Theatre on 5 May 1914, as Lord Murdon in The Dangerous Age.

During the First World War he served with the Essex Regiment. He received injuries that left his face partially scarred and paralysed. In his acting career he would use this injury to good effect, by showing the unblemished side of his face when playing comedy or romance and the scarred, paralysed side of his face when playing drama or tragedy. After the war, Banks joined the Birmingham Repertory Theatre. He returned to London in 1921, and established himself as a leading dramatic actor and West End star known for his powerful yet restrained performances.

Working in both London and New York City, he gained prominence on both sides of the Atlantic, and it was when he was in New York that Kenneth Macgowan persuaded him to go to Hollywood and make his first credited movie debut there in The Most Dangerous Game in 1932.

Film career

His formidable bulk and intimidating aspect served him well in his first important film role, as a diabolical Russian hunter of human prey in The Most Dangerous Game (1932). The film features Joel McCrea and Fay Wray. For the rest of his career, he divided his time between Britain and the United States and between film and theatre. His other film roles included Alfred Hitchcock's The Man Who Knew Too Much (1934), Fire Over England (1937), Jamaica Inn (1939), Laurence Olivier's Henry V (1944), and David Lean's Madeleine (1950). Against 'type', Banks starred in The Arsenal Stadium Mystery (1939), as the eccentric Inspector Anthony Slade.

His theatre roles included Eliza Comes to Stay (his American debut in 1914), Captain Hook in Peter Pan (his New York debut in 1924), the title role in Clive of India (1934), Petruchio in The Taming of the Shrew (1937), the schoolmaster in Goodbye, Mr Chips (1938), and James Jarvis in the Kurt Weill musical Lost in the Stars (1950).

Personal life
He married Gwendoline Haldane Unwin in 1915; they had three daughters, Daphne, Virginia, and Evangeline. Banks was appointed a Commander of the Order of the British Empire (CBE) for his services to theatre in 1950, the year of his last appearances on stage and screen. He died in 1952, aged 61, from a stroke he suffered while walking, and is buried in St Nicholas Churchyard in the village of Worth Matravers, Dorset.

Filmography

References

External links

1890 births
Military personnel from Liverpool
1952 deaths
Commanders of the Order of the British Empire
English male film actors
English male stage actors
Male actors from Liverpool
People educated at Glenalmond College
20th-century English male actors
British Army personnel of World War I
Essex Regiment soldiers
Burials in Dorset